John Lancaster (1816 – 21 April 1884) was an English Liberal politician who sat in the House of Commons from 1868 to 1874.

Lancaster was the son of John Lancaster of Prestwich, Lancashire. He was engaged in the coal and iron trades and was chairman of the Lancashire Union Railway. He was a JP for Lancashire and a Fellow of the Geological Society.
 
In 1865 Lancaster stood unsuccessfully for Parliament at Wigan. At the 1868 general election he was elected Member of Parliament for Wigan. He held the seat until 1874.

Lancaster died at the age of 67. The Graphic of Saturday, 26 April 1884 recorded
"Mr. John LANCASTER, formerly M.P., for Wigan, who rose from humble beginnings to the ownership of the great mines of Nantyglo Blaina, Monmouthshire. The captain and several of the crew of the 'Alabama', after its engagement with the 'Kearsarge', off Cherbourg, in 1864, were rescued by Mr. LANCASTER, who, to save them, exposed his yacht to the fire of the Federal war-steamer."
This refers to the Battle of Cherbourg in the American Civil War in which the Union sloop  sank the Confederate sloop .

In 1841 Lancaster married Euphemia Gibson, daughter of D. Gibson of Renfrewshire.

References

External links

 Portrait
 Biographical sketch

1816 births
1884 deaths
Liberal Party (UK) MPs for English constituencies
UK MPs 1868–1874
Members of the Parliament of the United Kingdom for Wigan
Fellows of the Royal Geographical Society
19th-century English businesspeople